Nigâr Hanım (1856 – 1 April 1918) was an Ottoman poet, who pioneered modern Western styles in a feminine mode. She is a major figure in post-Tanzimat Turkish poetry.

Biography 
Nigâr was born in Istanbul to Macar Osman Pasha, an Ottoman nobleman of Hungarian origin. She was educated at the Kadıköy Fransız Mektebi (French School in Kadıköy), later receiving lectures at home from private teachers. She was able to speak eight different languages and play piano at a young age.

She was married at age fourteen, but divorced after a few years of great unhappiness. By this marriage she had a son, Feridun Bey, who became a French teacher at Robert College and a tutor of Şehzade Ahmed Nihad, a grandson of Sultan Murad V.

Her early poetry is in the traditional divan style, but later she was influenced by Recaizade Mahmut Ekrem and others, and adopted a more modernist stance, influenced by the Western poetry of her time.  She was well versed in the cultures of East and West, and knew French, Greek, Arabic, and German.

Her book Efsus was the first poetry book written in Western style of poetry by a woman author. Like Mihrî Hatun, and possibly the first woman poet since her, her femininity is not hidden. Her writing style, choice of themes and presentation reflects a very feminine sensibility. Apart from poetry, she wrote prose and made several translations.

In her personal life, she was an important and well-known figure in the society of her time. Apart from her career as a poet, her life-style, outgoing personality and choice of clothing had a wide influence on society and the perspective of women at the time. Although it is not possible to say that she was a feminist, her view of woman rights was much ahead of her time.

She became increasingly isolated in the last years of her life, and was in great pain. She died 1918 in İstanbul.

Awards and Recognitions
Her humanitarian work was recognised by the award of the Order of Charity (Şefkat Nişanı).

In 1998, Şairler Sofası Park was inaugurated, she is featured in a sculpture by Gürdal Duyar along with 6 other famous poets. At the same time Namık Denizhan made a sculpture of her individually which is in the same park.

"Tell me Again" 
"Tell me Again" is an early love poem by Hanım (translation by Talat S. Halman).

Am I your only love -- in the whole world -- now?
Am I really the only object of your love?
If passions rage in your mind,
If love springs eternal in your heart --
Is it all meant for me?  Tell me again.

Tell me right now, am I the one who inspires
All your dark thoughts, all your sadness?
Share with me what you feel, what you think.
Come, my love, pour into my heart
Whatever gives you so much pain.
Tell me again.

Selected works

Poetry 
Efsus I
Efsus II
Nîrân
Aks-i Sada
Safahat-ı Kalb
Elhan-ı Vatan

Play 
Tesir-i Aşk

Memoir 
Hayatımın Hikâyesi (1959)

References 

1856 births
1918 deaths
Women poets from the Ottoman Empire
Divan poets from the Ottoman Empire
Burials at Aşiyan Asri Cemetery
Writers from Istanbul
19th-century poets from the Ottoman Empire
19th-century women writers from the Ottoman Empire
20th-century poets from the Ottoman Empire
20th-century women writers from the Ottoman Empire